Immigration, Refugees and Citizenship Canada (IRCC) is the department of the Government of Canada with responsibility for matters dealing with immigration to Canada, refugees, and Canadian citizenship. The department was established in 1994 following a reorganization.

Organization 
The Departmental Results Report (2018–2019), stated that a total of 7,414 full-time equivalent employees are currently employed with IRCC. The same report states that IRCC plans to have 7,378 full-time equivalent employees in 2019–2020 and 7304 in 2020–2021.

Organizational structure

Mandate, role and objective 

Immigration, Refugees and Citizenship Canada's mandate is specified in the Department of Citizenship and Immigration Act. The Minister of IRCC administers the Citizenship Act of 1977 and its subsequent amendments. The Minister of IRCC works closely with the Minister of Public Safety in relation to the administration of the Immigration and Refugee Protection Act.

IRCC, together with its partners, has the responsibility of conducting "the screening of potential permanent and temporary residents to protect the health, safety and security of Canadians." The issuance and control of Canadian passports and other travel documents that facilitate the travel of Canadian citizens, permanent residents and protected persons is also under the responsibility of IRCC.

In collaboration with its partners," IRCC will continue to work to build a "stronger Canada" in promoting programs and services geared towards helping newcomers to successfully integrate and fully live the Canadian way of life, maximizing their abilities to help build better communities. Instill in them the values, duties and responsibilities as new Canadians without prejudice regardless of their race and religious beliefs. It also aims to advance in terms of its immigration and humanitarian activities and policies.

The objective of IRCC is to be instrumental in helping build a stronger Canada through immigration which aims to continue its humanitarian efforts that is known all over the world. The vision is to solidify the goal of creating a stable economic agenda as well as its social and cultural landscape.

History
Further Information: History of immigration to Canada

Prior to the establishment of the Naturalization Act of 1947, persons who were born in Canada, as well as those who were naturalized Canadians regardless of their country of origin, were all categorized as British subjects. Therefore, during these times, "citizen" and "citizenship" referred to people living in Canada rather than those in possession of Canadian citizenship status.

When the Citizenship Act was put in place, it formalized the sense of nationalism and Canadian identity to its citizenry. Under the British North America Act of 1867, immigration responsibilities were shared by the federal government and provincial/territorial governments and commissions.

Citizenship and immigration legislations 
Immigration and citizenship legislation are laws that set standards, policies and practices in accordance with the Citizenship Act. The following is the chronology of Canadian immigration and citizenship laws.

Facilities 
IRCC operates a large network of "Citizenship and Immigration Centres" throughout Canada such as Case Processing Centres (CPCs), Centralized Intake Offices (CIOs), and Operations Support Centres (OPCs), as well as an important number of embassies, high commissions, and consulates abroad.

Domestic

International 
Canadian embassies and consular offices across the world play an important role in safeguarding its citizens while abroad. There are identified countries in different regions around the globe that are strategically located and serve as case processing centres for students, temporary residents, visitors, refugees and landed immigrants visa applications.

Service Canada is responsible for some of the domestic field operations of the department, while the Canada Border Services Agency controls enforcement and entry control at ports of entry.

IRCC remains responsible for the establishment of policies and processing of permanent and temporary resident visa, refugee protection and citizenship applications.

Acts and regulations 

Immigration, Refugees and Citizenship Canada was created and is guided by the principles provided in specific Canadian laws. The Canadian Charter of Rights and Freedom is its guiding light in enforcing immigration policies and laws, and preserving human rights. The below list of acts and regulations highlights the guiding principles for IRCC's operations and dealings with other organizations, both in Canada and abroad.

Acts 

Enumerated below are the Acts that are used and applied under any circumstances related to Canadian immigration, refugees, and citizenship.

Regulations 

Canadian regulations are enacted by the Parliament of Canada and are carried out as provided by the law. Regulations are generally sets of rules but have the weight of the rule of law, they can be more detailed such as "include definitions, licensing requirements, performance specifications, exemptions, forms, etc." The acts that govern IRCC are backed up with these sets of regulations.

Funding

The budget was spent through various immigration programs.

As part of an initiative called the "Settlement Program and Resettlement Assistance Program," updated application forms are provided online by IRCC for available funding opportunities for settlement organizations across Canada. This program supports partners in providing services that enable smooth transitions for the settlement of newcomers. The services can vary from language skills development in both official languages (English and French), employment opportunities banking on the newcomers educational backgrounds and skills. The four areas of focus for the program are:

 "information and orientation;" 
 "language training and skills development;"
 "labour market access;" and
 "welcoming communities."

IRCC also funds the Refugee Resettlement Assistance Program (RAP) by financing individual or family asylum seekers in finding temporary accommodations upon arrival in Canada, and eventually, locating a permanent place to live, supporting the ability to purchase daily basic needs and providing assistance with the development of general life skills.

The Government of Canada welcomed 25,000 Syrian Refugees by the end of February 2016 and also partook in funding this commitment in opening doors to this specific group of refugees. The refugees came into the country in three different refugee immigration schemes and are given up to 6 months of financial aid until they can fully stand on their own:

 Privately Sponsored Refugees (PSRs), who were financially supported by private citizens or organizations;
 Government Assisted Refugees (GARs), who were funded by IRCC through the Refugee RAP; and
 Blended Visa Office-Referred Refugees (BVORs), which is a type of refugee classified by UNCHR and subsequently paired with Canadian private sponsors.

Quebec Skilled Worker Program 
Quebec is the only province in Canada that is not a part of the Provincial Nominee Program (PNP), instead having its own system—the Quebec Skilled Worker Program (QSWP)—for the induction of immigrants into the province. The QSWP is the application process to be followed by foreign skilled workers interested in taking up Canadian permanent residency and living in Quebec.

In order for an overseas-born person to be able to immigrate to Canada through the QSWP, a 2-stage application process will have to be followed. The process begins with securing the Quebec Selection Certificate (Certificat de sélection du Québec, CSQ) from the province's Ministry of Immigration, Francisation and Integration.

After assessing the applicant on their own criteria, the province of Quebec will issue a CSQ as proof that the applicant has indeed been accepted by Quebec as a potential immigrant to the province. After the CSQ has been issued, the applicant will then have to apply to IRCC directly for the processing of their permanent residency in Canada. Applicants going through this program are expected to have at least 4 years of total processing time before permanent residency is approved. The estimated processing time is calculated while taking into consideration the time required for potentially submitting biometrics, if needed.

While generally considered to be a much longer process as compared to the federal Express Entry System of Canada, which takes only 6 months for 80% of the applications, there are nevertheless certain advantages that the QSWP has over the Express Entry.

Processing times of Express Entry vs Quebec Skilled Worker

Criticism

Quality of service 
IRCC has been claimed to lack properly-managed client support channels to assist applicants with their enquiries regarding their applications. Telephone calls to IRCC for permanent residency have an average wait time of 40 minutes. Customer support agents have been said to be untrained and lacking domain knowledge to answer an applicant's questions. There have been instances where web-based Case Specific Enquiries have been claimed to have lacked a proper response to applicants' questions. Examples include instances where applicants' additional documents were not routed to the proper department, thus leading to delays with, and, in some cases, rejection of, applications. As in the case of Vegreville Case Processing Centre, the Case Processing Centre responsible for examining applications was found to have lacked overall quality. As per Global News:According to a review of 996 files handled at the Vegreville Case Processing Centre in Alberta, which deals with permanent residence applications, between November 1 and December 6, 2014, the quality management team found that of the 617 request letters sent to applicants

 13% did not address all missing items;
 23% had either no timeline, an incomplete timeline, or did not mention the consequences of failing to reply to the request; and
 6%  were either “not professional” or chose the incorrect template form.
 Of 426 files that received a second review, decisions were still pending on 149 owing to errors made at an earlier stage.

Processing delays for Quebec Skilled Worker Program 

Due to delays, the Quebec Skilled Worker Program is not popular among highly-skilled immigrants who have other pathways of faster immigration to the rest of Canada. Moreover, skilled workers who are currently working or residing in Quebec are not eligible to apply through Express Entry according to the Canada–Québec Accord. These processing delays have led to many skilled workers and international students moving out of Quebec for faster immigration processing and the province of Quebec experiencing scarcity of skilled foreign workers.

Citizenship Commission

Under Immigration, Refugees and Immigration Canada, the Citizenship Commission is responsible for the administration of citizenship grants to new applications who are admissible for Canadian citizenship. Composed of citizenship judges across Canada, the Commission's mandate is to administer Oath of Citizenship; process and approve citizenship applications that meet residency requirements; educate new citizens with their civil responsibilities as new Canadians; and "to promote citizenship in communities."

Decisions will be made according to individual application circumstances, hence, making each citizenship judge unique and "independent decision makers." However, their decisions are subject for judicial review by the citizenship applicants and by the Minister of IRCC. Citizenship judges must follow the principles provided by administrative law and natural justice as well as the Citizenship Act, Citizenship Regulations and other relevant precedents applicable to each individual case.

Citizenship judges 

Citizenship judges are obliged to obey the mandate as stated by the Citizenship Commission under the Citizenship Act and the Citizenship Regulations. They provide citizenship application assessment ensuring that the applicants meet the necessary requirements, such as residency, they will administer the Oath of Citizenship during ceremonies and review the rights, privileges and duties of a Canadian citizen, conduct hearings, and supply written decisions following timeline set by the regulation. They are also asked to maintain the integrity of the citizenship application process.

The following are those currently serving, as of November 1, 2018, as citizenship judges:

Suzanne Carrière
Hardish Dhaliwal
Carol-Ann Hart
Rochelle Ivri
Joan Mahoney
Marie Senécal-Tremblay
Rania Sfeir
Rodney Simmons
Maj. Claude Villeneuve
Albert Wong

See also
 Canada Border Services Agency
 Immigration and Refugee Board of Canada
 Canadian nationality law
Immigration and Refugee Protection Act
Immigration to Canada
 Economic impact of immigration to Canada
Permanent residency in Canada
 Temporary resident
 Quebec Selection Certificate
 Human Resources and Skills Development Canada
 Canada–United States Safe Third Country Agreement
 STCA

Notes

References

External links

 Immigration and citizenship
Canada.ca
 e-CAS Tracker: A tool that automatically notifies people when their application status is updated on Citizenship and Immigration Canada's e-CAS service.

Federal departments and agencies of Canada
Immigration to Canada
Canada
Ministries established in 1994
1994 establishments in Canada
Migration-related organizations based in Canada